Cambois is a village in south-east Northumberland, England. It is situated on the north side of the estuary of the River Blyth between Blyth and Ashington on the North Sea coast.

Etymology

According to earlier scholarship, the etymology of the name is probably Gaelic cambas 'bay, creek'. However, the name could equally be from the Cumbric cognate of cambas, *camas 'bend in a river, bay', which would fit with Cambois's location at the confluence of Sleek Burn and the River Blyth. In either case, the spelling seems to have been influenced by French bois 'wood'.

History

Cambois was a township in Bedlingtonshire which, until 1844, was part of County Durham. It was a coal mining village from 1862 to week ending 20 April 1968 when Cambois Colliery closed.

Cambois is now closely related to the area known as North Blyth. The main commercial activity was the importation of alumina for the manufacture of aluminium at Lynemouth, but that smelter has now closed. Alumina is still imported and moved by rail to a smelter powered by the Lochaber hydroelectric scheme, near Fort William on the west coast of Scotland.

In 1883, the Coal Company gave a list of the property it owned, or leased:

Britishvolt

In December 2020, Cambois was confirmed as the location for a new Britishvolt battery manufacturing plant. In July 2021, plans for the £2.6bn gigafactory employing 3,000 people were approved, with the new plant to be located on former coalyards adjacent to the now-demolished power station in Cambois. It will produce lithium-ion batteries for the automotive industry. Britishvolt appointed ISG as its construction partner who began work on clearing the site in late 2021. In January 2022, the UK government, through its Automotive Transformation Fund, invested £100m in the Britishvolt project, alongside asset management company abrdn and its property investment arm Tritax, developing what was planned to be Britain's fourth largest building. However, construction work was halted in August 2022 amid funding concerns, with manufacturing now set to start in mid-2025, more than a year later than initially planned.  On 17 January 2023, Britishvolt went into administration, and its factory site was put up for sale.

References

External links

Villages in Northumberland
Populated coastal places in Northumberland